Melfort (Miller Field) Aerodrome  is located  west of Melfort, Saskatchewan, Canada.

See also 
 List of airports in Saskatchewan

References 

Registered aerodromes in Saskatchewan
Flett's Springs No. 429, Saskatchewan